Greasbrough is a small suburb in Rotherham, in South Yorkshire, England. The suburb falls in the Greasbrough  Ward of Rotherham Metropolitan Borough Council.  Greasbrough had its own local council, Greasbrough UDC (Urban District Council), until its absorption into the County Borough of Rotherham in 1936.

It is located two miles (3 km) north of Rotherham. Greasbrough has a gothic-style church called St. Mary's, which was completed in 1828. A schoolroom is built into the rear lower part of the building. There are also Wesleyan and Independent chapels, also with attached schools.
There is a main school in Greasbrough named Greasbrough Junior & Infant School, situated on Munsbrough Rise. This also has a nursery in the same building, starting from the age of 3. 
Greasbrough also has a football team called Greasbrough Youth, with players from ages 6.
It is also well known for its Working Men's Club which has been host to many famous acts over the years such as Johnnie Ray, Bob Monkhouse, Matt Monro and Adam Faith.

Notable residents
Omar Ebrahim, baritone (b. 1956)
Jack Lambert, footballer (1902–1940)
John Rose, industrial chemist (1911–1976)
Laura Jane Suisted, journalist (1840–1903)

See also
Listed buildings in Rotherham (Wingfield Ward)
Masbrough Independent Chapel

References

External links

Greasbrough page

Villages in South Yorkshire
Geography of Rotherham